Paul Myles Farrer (born 1973) is a British composer known for his work in film and television. He was born in 1973 in Worcester, England.

In a career spanning more than 30 years he has composed music for some of the biggest programmes on British Television including The Weakest Link, The Chase, The Wheel, Dancing on Ice, Gladiators, Michael McIntyre’s Big Show, The John Bishop Show, Ninja Warrior and many more. His music has also been used in the film Domino in 2005.

Paul is a member of the British Academy of Songwriters, Composers and Authors as well as the Ivor’s Academy of Composers and Songwriters. He was the 2003 recipient of the BMI Composer Award and has been nominated for a Royal Television Society Award on four occasions.

References

External links
 
 

1973 births
English film score composers
English male film score composers
English songwriters
Musicians from Worcester, England
Living people